Anja Valant (born 8 September 1977) is a retired Slovenian athlete who competed in the triple jump and long jump. Valant competed in the triple jump at the 2000 Olympic Games where she finished ninth.

Her personal best jump for the triple jump  is 14.69 metres, achieved on 4 June 2000 in Kalamata and her personal best in the long jump is 6.54 metres, achieved on 18 May 1997 in Dolenjske Toplice, Slovenia. Her leap of 14.69m was the Slovenian national record until Marija Šestak jumped 14.92 metres on 3 June 2007 in Ljubljana.

Valant retired from competition after the 2012 season.

Achievements

References

1977 births
Living people
Slovenian female triple jumpers
Athletes (track and field) at the 2000 Summer Olympics
Olympic athletes of Slovenia
Slovenian female long jumpers
Athletes (track and field) at the 1997 Mediterranean Games
Mediterranean Games competitors for Slovenia